Baran is a surname and a given name (pronounced buh-run). Although the name "Baran" is used in various different languages, it's most commonly used as a girl's name in Farsi. Baran means rain. Since rain is uncommon in Iran and is a symbol of god’s mercy and happiness for Iranians, the name Baran has special and romantic connotations.

Surname
 Arkadiusz Baran (born 1979), Polish footballer
 Bernard Baran (1965–2014), American child care worker convicted and later exonerated of sex abuse
 Hanna Arsenych-Baran (1970–2021), Ukrainian prose writer, novelist and poet
 İlhan Baran (born 1934), Turkish composer
 Martin Baran (born 1988), Slovak football player
 Paul Baran (1926–2011), American inventor of packet switching
 Paul A. Baran (1909–1964), American economist
 Phil S. Baran (born 1977), American chemist
 Radosław Baran (born 1989), Polish wrestler
 Robert Baran (born 1992), Polish wrestler
 Stanisław Baran (1920–1993), Polish football player
 Witold Baran (1939–2020), Polish middle-distance runner
 Zeyno Baran (born 1972), Turkish-born American scholar and journalist

Given name

First name
 Baran (born 1988), Iranian singer
 Baran Kosari (born 1985), Iranian actress
 Baran Mogultay (born 2004), German football player
 Baran bo Odar (born 1978), German film and TV director and screenwriter
 Baran Süzer, Turkish businessman

Middle name
 Sezgin Baran Korkmaz (born 1977), Turkish businessman

See also
 
 Beran (surname), Czech variant of the surname

Polish-language surnames
Slovak-language surnames
Turkish masculine given names
Persian feminine given names